The Rochester Ravens were an American women's soccer team which played from 2009 to 2013. The team was a member of the United Soccer Leagues W-League, the second tier of women's soccer in the United States and Canada. The team played in the Great Lakes Division of the Central Conference against teams from  Hamilton, Laval, London, Ottawa, Quebec City and Toronto.

The team played its home games at Wegmans Stadium at the Aquinas Institute of Rochester in the city of Rochester, New York and they also played home games at the Capelli Sport Stadium.

The team was the successor to the Rochester Rhinos Women, which was affiliated with the USL First Division team Rochester Rhinos for three years from 2006 through 2008. The original team was founded (as the Ravens) in 1996, and was owned by Jill McCabe, until it was sold to the former Rochester Rhinos ownership of Frank DuRoss, Steve Donner, Chris Economides, Peter Bourne, and Chris Wilmot in late 2005. In 2008, the Rhinos' new owner, Rob Clark, sold the women's USL W-League soccer franchise. The new team was announced on May 1, 2009, by the new owner Doug Miller, former star Rochester Rhinos player.  On January 28, 2013, Doug Miller announced that the Ravens will cease operations, stating that with the Western New York Flash once again playing in the top tier of women's soccer there is not a need for a second women's team in a lower league in Rochester.

Players

Final Season Roster

Staff
  Doug Miller Owner
  Peter Carpenter General Manager
  Steve Christenson Head Coach
  Ashley Grove Assistant Coach
  Gavin McInerney Goal Keeping Coach

Year-by-year
See also:  2003 season
See also:  2004 season
See also:  2005 season
See also:  2006 season
See also:  2007 season
See also:  2008 season
See also:  2009 season
See also:  2010 season
See also:  2011 season

References

Rhinos women
Women's soccer clubs in New York (state)
Rochester New York FC
USL W-League (1995–2015) teams
2009 establishments in New York (state)
Association football clubs established in 2009
2013 disestablishments in New York (state)
Association football clubs disestablished in 2013